No Secrets is the third studio album by American singer-songwriter Carly Simon, released by Elektra Records, on November 28, 1972.

Simon's major commercial breakthrough, No Secrets spent five weeks at No. 1 on the US Billboard 200 chart and quickly went Gold, as did its lead single, "You're So Vain", which remained at No. 1 on the Billboard Hot 100 chart for three weeks, and the Adult Contemporary chart for two weeks. The second single, "The Right Thing to Do", reached No. 17 on the Billboard Hot 100 and No. 4 on the Adult Contemporary chart. The album was officially certified Platinum by the Recording Industry Association of America (RIAA) on December 12, 1997. It was certified Gold by the British Phonographic Industry (BPI) on November 11, 2011.

No Secrets is ranked No. 997 in All-Time Top 1000 Albums (3rd. edition, 2000). The making of the album, including commentary from many of the main musicians and production staff, was examined in the 2017 documentary Carly Simon: No Secrets, directed by Guy Evans for Eagle Rock Film Productions and broadcast on BBC Four.

Recording and packaging
"Angel from Montgomery" was recorded by Carly Simon in her first session for the No Secrets album which was produced by Paul Buckmaster and featured James Taylor's vocals and Danny Kortchmar on guitar. Simon recalls: "Elektra rejected [the tracks from that session] and...asked me to work with Richard Perry. [Elektra] didn't think Buckmaster would produce a hit record for me". Carly's sister, Joanna Simon, sang background vocals for the album.

At the invitation of producer Richard Perry, Simon recorded the album at Trident Studios in London, where Perry was keen for Simon to work with engineer Robin Cable. Trident Studios had previously been the venue for the recording of notable albums including The Beatles' White Album, David Bowie's Space Oddity and Elton John's second album.

The photograph for the cover, taken by Ed Caraeff, was shot in front of the Portobello Hotel, on Stanley Gardens in London's Notting Hill.

Reception

Initial reviews for No Secrets were mixed to positive. Robert Christgau, writing in Creem, said, "if a horse could sing in a monotone, the horse would sound like Carly Simon, only a horse wouldn't rhyme 'yacht', 'apricot', and 'gavotte'. Is that some kind of joke?" Stephen Holden in Rolling Stone concluded that "what finally makes No Secrets so refreshing is her singing, which conveys the finest spirit of patrician generosity."

More recent reviews have been much more positive. For example, AllMusic's William Ruhlmann gave the album four-and-a-half stars (out of five). Ruhlmann noted that "You're So Vain", "set the album's saucy tone, with its air of sexually frank autobiography and its reflections on the jet-set lifestyle." He also stated that "now that she felt she had found true love, she was as willing to acknowledge her own mistakes and regrets as she was to point fingers." He concluded that "Perry paid particular attention to Simon's vocals and gave her music a new pop/rock 'buoyancy that previous albums lacked'."

"You're So Vain" was also voted No. 216 in RIAA's Songs of the Century. It remains Simon's biggest hit and is considered her signature song.

Awards

Track listing
Credits adapted from the album's liner notes.

Personnel 
Credits adapted from the album's liner notes

Musicians

 Carly Simon – lead vocals (all tracks), backing vocals (1, 7), acoustic piano (1–4, 10), string arrangements (3), ARP synthesizer arrangements (4), acoustic guitar (5–8)
 David Hentschel – ARP synthesizer (4)
 Peter Robinson – acoustic piano (6)
 Nicky Hopkins – acoustic piano (7, 9)
 Bill Payne – organ (7)
 Paul Keough – acoustic guitar (5, 8)
 Lowell George – slide guitar (7)
 Jimmy Ryan – bass (1, 10), guitar (2, 3), acoustic guitar (4, 10), lead guitar (5), electric guitar (6–9)
 Klaus Voormann – bass (2, 3, 5–9)
 Andy Newmark – drums (1, 2, 6, 8, 10)
 Jim Gordon – drums (3, 5)
 Jim Keltner – drums (7, 9)
 Ray Cooper – congas (1, 9)
 Richard Perry – percussion (3)
 Bobby Keys – tenor saxophone (9)
 Kirby Johnson – string arrangements (1, 2, 5), horn arrangements (1), woodwind arrangements (2), conductor (5), electric piano (5)
 Paul Buckmaster – orchestration (3), synthesizers (6, 10); orchestra, synthesizer and woodwind arrangements (6, 10), conductor (6, 10)
 Vicki Brown – backing vocals (1)
 Liza Strike – backing vocals (1)
 Mick Jagger – backing vocals (uncredited) (3)
 James Taylor – backing vocals (7)
 Bonnie Bramlett – backing vocals (9)
 Linda McCartney – backing vocals (9)
 Paul McCartney – backing vocals (9)
 Doris Troy – backing vocals (9)

Production

 Richard Perry – producer 
 Robin Geoffrey Cable – engineer, recording, remixing
 Mark Berry – recording
 Bill Schnee – engineer, remixing 
 Doug Sax – disc cutting
 Robert L. Heimall – art direction, design
 Ed Caraeff – cover photography
 Peter Simon – inner sleeve photography
 David Katz – musicians contractor

Charts

Weekly charts

Year-end charts

Certifications

References

External links
 Carly Simon's Official Website
 "Carly Simon’s ‘No Secrets’ Re-released. But Some Secrets Remain Intact. (Who Was ‘So Vain’?)" at huffpost.com, 2012

Carly Simon albums
1972 albums
Albums arranged by Paul Buckmaster
Albums produced by Richard Perry
Albums recorded at Trident Studios
Elektra Records albums